Gbonné is a town in western Ivory Coast. It is a sub-prefecture and commune of Biankouma Department in Tonkpi Region, Montagnes District.

In 2014, the population of the sub-prefecture of Gbonné was 35,957.

Villages
The twenty five villages of the sub-prefecture of Gbonné and their population in 2014 are:

Notes

Sub-prefectures of Tonkpi
Communes of Tonkpi